Hashizume is a Japanese surname. Notable people with the surname include:

, Japanese actor
, Japanese actor
, Japanese-American singer
, Japanese swimmer
, Japanese footballer

Japanese-language surnames